Sunday Brunch is a British television programme presented by Tim Lovejoy and Simon Rimmer. It is broadcast live on Channel 4 on Sunday mornings and features cookery and interviews with celebrity guests.

Format
The programme began on 25 March 2012. It was first announced by Channel 4 in February 2012 after the BBC series Something for the Weekend ended its seven-year run due to budget cuts. This is the same presenting team as the BBC show, with the exception of Louise Redknapp and Amanda Hamilton.

The show runs live for three hours, including advertisements, which is 90 minutes longer than Something for the Weekend at the end of its run. It initially was broadcast for two hours including advertisements from 10:00am to 12 midday, but from 19 May 2013 was expanded to three hours from 9:30am to 12:30pm.

Each programme features: Simon Rimmer cooking with Tim Lovejoy and the week's guests; highlights from television and film; interviews with guests; drink tasting with an expert, usually Rebecca Seal; a trend round-up segment with an expert; and the 'Sunday Brunch Playlist', which is a selection of music videos chosen by the presenters and guests.

The show was not broadcast on 22 March 2020 plus the following few months, following the COVID-19 pandemic in the United Kingdom. Instead in its place, Channel 4 aired episodes of Food Unwrapped, Come Dine with Me and Ramsay's Kitchen Nightmares USA.  The series returned on 24th May 2020.

Daily Brunch
Daily Brunch with Ocado was a spin-off of Sunday Brunch, presented by Lovejoy and Rimmer. It was broadcast live on Channel 4 every weekday morning for 60 minutes. Daily Brunch followed a similar format of Sunday Brunch, with cookery and interviews with celebrity guests.

On 29 September 2014, it was announced that Rimmer and Lovejoy would host a new spin-off series from Sunday Brunch. The show began on 13 October 2014 and aired daily at 10am for 40 episodes.

References

External links

2012 British television series debuts
2010s British cooking television series
2010s British television talk shows
2020s British cooking television series
2020s British television talk shows
British cooking television shows
Channel 4 original programming
Television series by Banijay